The Wirtschaftswunder ("economic miracle"), also known as the Miracle on the Rhine, was the rapid reconstruction and development of the economies of West Germany and Austria after World War II (adopting an ordoliberalism-based social market economy). The expression referring to this phenomenon was first used by The Times in 1950.

Beginning with the replacement of the Reichsmark with the Deutsche Mark in 1948 as legal tender (the Schilling was similarly re-established in Austria), a lasting era of low inflation and rapid industrial growth was overseen by the government led by West German Chancellor Konrad Adenauer and his Minister of Economics, Ludwig Erhard, who went down in history as the "father of the West German economic miracle." In Austria, efficient labor practices led to a similar period of economic growth.

The era of economic growth raised West Germany and Austria from total wartime devastation to developed nations in modern Europe. At the founding of the European Common Market in 1957 West Germany's economic growth stood in contrast to the struggling conditions at the time in the United Kingdom.

West Germany

The fundamental reason for the quick economic recovery of West Germany can be found in the ordoliberal growth model. Germany had a skilled workforce and a high technological level in 1946, but its capital stock had largely been destroyed during and after the war. This small capital stock was compounded by the difficulty in converting the German economy to the production of civilian goods, as well as rampant monetary and regulatory problems, leading to an unusually low economic output during the first post-war years.

These initial problems were overcome by the time of the currency reform of 1948, which replaced the Reichsmark with the Deutsche Mark as legal tender, halting rampant inflation. This act to strengthen the West German economy had been explicitly forbidden during the two years that JCS 1067 was in effect. JCS 1067 had directed the U.S. forces of occupation in Germany to "take no steps looking toward the economic rehabilitation of Germany".

At the same time, the government, following Erhard's advice, cut taxes sharply on moderate incomes. Walter Heller, a young economist with the U.S. occupation forces who was later to become chairman of President Kennedy's Council of Economic Advisers, wrote in 1949 that to "remove the repressive effect of extremely high rates, Military Government Law No. 64 cut a wide swath across the German tax system at the time of the currency reform." Individual income tax rates, in particular, fell dramatically. Previously the tax rate on any income over 6,000 Deutschmark had been 95 percent. After tax reform, this 95 percent rate applied only to annual incomes above 250,000 Deutschmark. For the West German with an annual income of about 2,400 Deutschmark in 1950, the marginal tax rate fell from 85 percent to 18 percent.

The Allied dismantling of the West German coal and steel industries decided at the Potsdam Conference was virtually completed by 1950; equipment had then been removed from 706 manufacturing plants in the west and steel production capacity had been reduced by 6,700,000 tons. Although the industrially important Saarland with its rich coal fields was returned to West Germany in 1957, it remained economically integrated in a customs union with France until 1959 and France extracted coal from the area until 1981.

West Germany proceeded quickly after 1948 to rebuild its capital stock and thus to increase its economic output at stunning rates. The very high capital investment rate thanks to low consumption and a very small need for replacement capital investments (due to the still small capital stock) drove this recovery during the 1950s. Living standards also rose steadily, with the purchasing power of wages increasing by 73% from 1950 to 1960. As noted by the British journalist Terence Prittie in the early Sixties:

Productivity growth in West Germany enabled most workers to obtain significant improvements in their living standards and 'security of life.' David Eversley wrote,

 As since there was no army before 1955, there was little war spending.

Reparations

In addition to the physical barriers that had to be overcome for the West German economic recovery, there were also intellectual challenges. The Allies confiscated intellectual property of great value, all German patents, at home and abroad and used them to strengthen their own industrial competitiveness by licensing them to Allied companies.

Immediately after the German surrender and for the next two years, the U.S. pursued a vigorous program of looting technological and scientific expertise as well as all patents in Germany. John Gimbel's book "Science Technology and Reparations: Exploitation and Plunder in Postwar Germany" concludes the "intellectual reparations" taken by the U.S. and the UK amounted to close to $10 billion. During the more than two years that this policy was in place, new industrial research in Germany was hampered because it was unprotected and freely available to overseas competitors, encouraged by occupation authorities to access all records and facilities.

Marshall Plan

Thousands of the best German researchers and engineers were working in the Soviet Union and in the United States. The Marshall Plan was only extended to Western Germany after it was realized the suppression of its economy was holding back the recovery of other European countries and was not the main force behind the Wirtschaftswunder. However, it likely greatly contributed to Germany's overall economic recovery. Furthermore, often overlooked is the effect of the "unofficial contributions" of 150,000 U.S. occupation troops, earning as much as 4 Deutschmark to the dollar. These marks were spent within West Germany to buy food, luxury items, beer and cars, as well as entertaining the locals and for prostitutes. During exercises such numbers of soldiers would swell to over 250,000. Nonetheless, the amount of monetary aid, which was mainly in the form of loans, about $1.4 billion, was greatly overshadowed by the amount the Germans had to pay back as war reparations and by the charges the Allies made on the Germans for the ongoing cost of the occupation, about $2.4 billion per year. In 1953 it was decided that Germany would repay $1.1 billion of the aid it had received. The last repayment was made in June 1971.

The demands of the Korean War in 1950–53 led to a global shortage of goods that helped overcome lingering resistance to the purchase of West German products. At the time West Germany had a large pool of skilled labour, partly as a result of the deportations and migrations which involved up to 16.5 million Germans. This helped West Germany to more than double the value of its exports during and shortly after the war. Apart from these factors, hard work and long hours at full capacity among the population in the 1950s, 1960s and early 1970s and extra labour supplied by thousands of Gastarbeiter ("guest workers", since the late 1950s) provided a vital base for the sustainment of the economic upturn with additional workforce. From the late 1950s, West Germany had one of the world's strongest economies. The East German economy also showed strong growth, but not as much as in West Germany, due to the bureaucratic system, emigration of working-age East Germans to West Germany and reparations to the USSR in terms of resources. Unemployment hit a record low of 0.7–0.8% in 1961–1966 and 1970–1971. Ludwig Erhard, who served as Minister of the Economy in Chancellor Adenauer's cabinet from 1949 until 1963 and later became Chancellor, is often associated with the West German Wirtschaftswunder.

Austria

Austria was also included in the Marshall Plan and can thus be included in any consideration of the Wirtschaftswunder. Through the nationalisation of key industries (VOEST, AMAG, Steyr-Puch) and yet more long working hours, full economic capacity was reached. Using West Germany as a guide, the currency was stabilised when the Schilling was reintroduced in place of the Reichsmark. This economic policy was known in journalistic circles as the Raab-Kamitz-Kurs, named after Julius Raab, Austrian chancellor from 1953, and his Finance Minister Reinhard Kamitz similar to the West German Adenauer-Erhard-Kurs.

By state major projects such as the Kaprun hydroelectric plant or the West Autobahn, unemployment fell and social peace was ensured. In the 1950s the first Gastarbeiter from Southern Italy and Greece arrived in the country, as more manual labour was required to maintain the economic upswing.

See also

 Economy of Germany
 GARIOA
 History of the Ruhr District
 Industrial plans for Germany
 Japanese economic miracle
 Marshall Plan
 Miracle on the Han River
 Miracolo economico
 Morgenthau Plan
 Post-World War II boom
 Record years
 Social market economy
 Spanish miracle
 Trente Glorieuses

Notes

External links

  
 Interview with Gunther Harkort Representative of the Federal Republic of Germany to the Economic Cooperation Administration (ECA), 1949–1952.
 Interview with General Lucius D. Clay  Deputy to U.S. General Dwight D. Eisenhower, 1945; deputy military governor, Germany (U.S.) 1946; commander in chief, U.S. Forces in Europe and military governor, U.S. Zone, Germany, 1947–49; retired 1949.
 Interview with General William Henry Draper Jr. Chief, Economics Division, Control Council for Germany, 1945–1946; Military Government Adviser to the Secretary of State, Moscow Conference of Foreign Ministers, 1947; Under Secretary of War, 1947; Under Secretary of the Army, 1947–1949;
  'Time Magazine Faceless Crisis', 4 April 1949.
 Letter from Konrad Adenauer to Robert Schuman (26 July 1949) Warning him of the consequences of the dismantling policy.
 Picture of demonstration against dismantling (7 June 1949) Workers in the Ruhr demonstrate against the dismantling of their factories by the Allied forces of occupation.
 Picture: dismantling the Iron and Steel Industry 'We want to work, we will help you to rebuild Europe' Workers at dismantled plant protest.
 Picture: 12,000 factory workers demonstrate against the dismantling of German industry (19 August 1949)

1950s economic history
Aftermath of World War II in Austria
Aftermath of World War II in Germany
American influence in post–World War II Europe
Economy of Austria
Economy of West Germany
Economic booms
German words and phrases
Konrad Adenauer
Ordoliberalism
Post–World War II economic booms